Jewish Care is a British charity, working mainly in London and South East England, providing health and social care support services for the Jewish community.

The charity runs over 70 centres and services which include care homes, community centres, independent living and other services such as support groups, a family carers team and telephone helpline.

The organisation cares for more than 10,000 people every week, stating that they operate with the belief that Jewish people should have access to specialist services that are designed to meet their needs. Jewish Care claims this is reflected in the care it provides which recognises traditions, beliefs and cultures, which are frequently shared by Jews. Jewish festivals, including the weekly Sabbath, are celebrated in Jewish Care homes, independent living communities and community centres.

Care and services are provided without assessment of the level or nature of an individual's religious observance. The charity has over 1,300 staff made up of over 70 nationalities and 3,000 volunteers.

Services
Jewish Care provides services for:

 Older people
 People caring for others
 People living with dementia
 People with a physical or sensory disability, including those who are visually impaired
 Holocaust survivors and refugees
 People with mental health problems
 Younger people
 People who are facing end of life

The charity also has a dedicated helpline providing support, information, advice and signposting for health and social care issues.

Board of Trustees
Chairman: Steven Lewis
Vice Chairs: Debra Fox, Arnold Wagner OBE
Treasurers: Michael Blake, Simon Friend
Trustees: Linda Bogod, Michael Brodtman, Rachel Anticoni, Linda Bogod, Michael Brodtman, Antony Grossman, Gayle Klein, Douglas Krikler, Lord Livingston of Parkhead, Nicola Loftus, Dr Dean Noimark, Stuart Roden
Chief Executive: Daniel Carmel-Brown
President: Lord Levy
Honorary Presidents: Lord Young of Graffham, Dame Gail Ronson, Stephen Zimmerman

Quotes
Tony Blair, when he was British Prime Minister, said of the charity: "Jewish Care is not just Jewish values in action; it is actually the best of British values in action. You can be really, really proud of the work that you do."

Chancellor Sajid Javid praised communal organisations like Jewish Care and said "One thing that distinguishes the Jewish community is the way you look after each other in so many ways..It could teach many other communities about how much they can do for each other".

Jewish Care is one of the 100 largest UK charitable organisations ranked by annual expenditure.

History
The charity was formed in 1990 by the merger of:
 Jewish Welfare Board
 Jewish Blind Society

Since then, nine more charities have merged with it, including:
 The Jewish Home and Hospital at Tottenham
 Food for the Jewish Poor (a soup kitchen)
 British Tay–Sachs Foundation
 Clore Manor (Friends of the London Jewish Hospital)
 Hyman Fine House
 Stepney Jewish (B'nai B'rith) Clubs and Settlements
 Sinclair House — Redbridge Jewish Youth and Community Centre

Jewish Care operates in association with:
 Otto Schiff Housing Association
 JAMI (The Jewish Association For Mental Illness)

The Jewish Board of Guardians, founded in London in 1859, was one of the oldest of the charities from which Jewish Care has descended. Gail Ronson took part in organising the celebration of the 125th anniversary of Jewish Care, in 1983, which was attended by Prince Charles and Princess Diana.

References

External links

Archives of Jewish Care (MS 173). University of Southampton

Jewish charities based in the United Kingdom
Social care in the United Kingdom